Florian Faist (born 10 April 1989) is an Austrian professional footballer who plays as a goalkeeper for Austrian Bundesliga club TSV Hartberg.

Club career
He made his Austrian Football First League debut for TSV Hartberg on 22 August 2014 in a game against Kapfenberger SV.

References

External links
 

1989 births
People from Hartberg District
Living people
Austrian footballers
TSV Hartberg players
2. Liga (Austria) players
Association football goalkeepers
Footballers from Styria
Austrian Football Bundesliga players
21st-century Austrian people